Musa campestris is a species of wild banana (genus Musa), endemic to the island of Borneo. It is placed in section Callimusa (now including the former section Australimusa), having a diploid chromosome number of 2n = 20.

Gallery

References

campestris
Endemic flora of Borneo
Plants described in 1902
Taxa named by Odoardo Beccari